Club FM (100.4 FM) is a national radio station based in Tirana, Albania which focuses on new releases and current music hits. It first went on air in February 1998 by broadcasting gold music, but soon turned to a pop format. Its music genre is different from most other Albanian radio stations as it mostly plays commercial music and promotes professional musicians. The studios are located in the centre of Tirana at Hotel Rogner.

Promotional activities 
Important singers and famous groups such as Bellini, Boney M, Antique, London Beat and Shaft have been invited by Radio Club FM to broadcast for its listeners in Albania.

In addition, the station has made it possible for listeners to take part in big concerts across Europe by singers such as Sting and Eros Ramazzotti.

References 

Radio stations in Albania
Radio stations established in 1998
Mass media in Tirana
Defunct mass media in Albania